Polci may be, 

Polci language
Gerry Polci